The 1990 New York Yankees season was the 88th season for the Yankees. The team finished in seventh place in the American League East with a record of 67-95, finishing 21 games behind the Boston Red Sox. It was the Yankees' first last-place finish in 24 years (and their first last-place in the division era), the most losses they accumulated in a season since 1912 (a record which still stands), and their most recent last-place finish to date. New York was managed by Stump Merrill and Bucky Dent. The Yankees played at Yankee Stadium.

In an historic changing of the guard, the Yankees finally left SportsChannel NY at the end of the 1989 season, moving their cable and satellite broadcasts to the cable-only MSG Network.

Offseason

Notable transactions
 October 1989: Dickie Noles was released by the Yankees.
 October 4, 1989: Steve Kiefer was released by the Yankees.
 November 20, 1989: Rafael Santana was released by the Yankees.
 November 21, 1989: Pascual Pérez was signed as a free agent by the Yankees.
 December 12, 1989: Hal Morris and Rodney Imes (minors) were traded by the Yankees to the Cincinnati Reds for Tim Leary and Van Snider.
 December 20, 1989: Rick Cerone was signed as a free agent by the Yankees.
 February 17, 1990: Mariano Rivera was signed as an amateur free agent by the Yankees.
 March 13, 1990: Orlando Miller was traded by the Yankees to the Houston Astros for Dave Silvestri and a player to be named later. The Astros completed the deal by sending Daven Bond (minors) to the Yankees on June 11.

Death of Billy Martin
 
Multi-time former Yankees manager Billy Martin was working as a special consultant to Yankees owner George Steinbrenner when he was killed in a one-car crash in Binghamton, New York, on Christmas Day (December 25) in 1989. Martin had been drinking heavily with his friend, William Reedy, who was driving a pickup truck at the time of the accident. When Martin was killed, the media reported that he was a passenger in Reedy's pickup. However, Peter Golenbock, in his book Wild, High, and Tight: The Life and Death of Billy Martin, makes the case that Martin was the driver and that his wife and Reedy covered up the truth. According to the HBO TV series Autopsy, forensic pathologist Dr. Michael Baden performed the autopsy on Martin and investigated the accident scene, including the pick-up truck in which Martin died. The autopsy revealed that Martin's impact injuries were all on the right side, and that hair and other DNA found on the right side of the shattered windshield belonged to Martin, who was not wearing a seatbelt at the time of the accident. The conclusion of the autopsy study was that Reedy drove the pick-up.

Billy Martin was eulogized by Cardinal John Joseph O'Connor at St. Patrick's Cathedral, New York, before his funeral at Gate of Heaven Cemetery in Hawthorne, New York. His grave is located about 150 feet from the grave of Babe Ruth. The following epitaph by Billy Martin himself appears on the headstone: I may not have been the greatest Yankee to put on the uniform but I was the proudest. Former President of the United States Richard Nixon attended Martin's funeral. The Yankees started the season with a small number 1 on their left sleeves.

Regular season
 June 6, 1990: Yankees manager Bucky Dent was fired before a game against the Red Sox at Fenway Park. George Steinbrenner was severely criticized for firing Dent, his 18th managerial change in 18 years, because he did it in Boston, where Dent had his greatest moment as a player.  However, Bill Pennington called the firing of Dent "merciless." But Yankees television analyst Tony Kubek blasted at Steinbrenner for the firing in a harsh, angry way. At the beginning of the broadcast of the game on MSG Network, he said to Yankees television play-by-play announcer Dewayne Staats, "George Steinbrenner...mishandled this. You don't take a Bucky Dent (at) the site of one of the greatest home runs in Yankee history and fire him and make it a media circus for the Boston Red Sox." He then stared defiantly on camera and said to Steinbrenner, "You don't do it by telephone, either, George. You do it face to face, eyeball to eyeball...If you really are a winner, you should not have handled this like a loser." He then said, angrily, "George, you're a bully and a coward." He then said that "What all this does, it just wrecks George Steinbrenner's credibility with his players, with the front office and in baseball more than it already is–if that's possible. It was just mishandled." The firing of Dent shook New York to its core and the Yankees flagship radio station then, WABC, which also criticized the firing, ran editorials demanding that Steinbrenner sell the team.
 On July 30, 1990, Commissioner Fay Vincent banned Steinbrenner from baseball for life after he paid Howard Spira, a small-time gambler, $40,000 for "dirt" after Dave Winfield sued him for failing to pay his foundation the $300,000  guaranteed in his contract.
 October 3, 1990: Cecil Fielder hit two home runs at Yankee Stadium to finish with 51 for the season. The 50th home run was hit off of Steve Adkins. Fielder would be the first Major Leaguer since George Foster in 1977 to hit 50 home runs in a season. It was the 18th time that a major leaguer (and the 11th time that an American League player) hit for 50 home runs in a season.

Season standings

Record vs. opponents

Notable transactions
 April 29, 1990: Luis Polonia was traded by the Yankees to the California Angels for Claudell Washington and Rich Monteleone.
 May 11, 1990: Dave Winfield was traded by the Yankees to the California Angels in exchange for Mike Witt.
 June 4, 1990: Clay Parker and Lance McCullers were traded by the Yankees to the Detroit Tigers for Matt Nokes.
 September 24, 1990: Deion Sanders was released by the Yankees.

Draft picks
June 4, 1990: 1990 Major League Baseball Draft
Carl Everett was drafted by the Yankees in the 1st round.
 Robert Eenhoorn  was drafted by the Yankees in the 2nd round of the 1990 June Draft. Player signed June 10, 1990.
Sam Militello was drafted by the Yankees in the 6th round.
Jalal Leach was drafted by the Yankees in the 7th round. Player signed June 8, 1990.
Ricky Ledée was drafted by the Yankees in the 16th round. Player signed June 5, 1990.
Andy Pettitte was drafted by the Yankees in the 22nd round, but did not sign.
Jorge Posada was drafted by the Yankees in the 24th round. Player signed May 24, 1991.
Shane Spencer was drafted by the Yankees in the 28th round. Player signed June 7, 1990.

Roster

Kevin Maas
 Kevin Maas set a major league record for the fewest at bats (72) to hit 10 home runs. He also set a record by hitting his first 15 home runs in the fewest at-bats. About halfway through the season a group of a dozen or so young ladies began wearing "Maas-tops" to Yankees home games and sitting in the right field stands. Whenever Maas hit a home run to right, the girls would get up, remove their tops and jump up and down until Maas finished circling the bases. However, after a few home runs the women were banned from entering Yankee Stadium.

Andy Hawkins no-hitter
 July 1, 1990: Yankees pitcher Andy Hawkins threw a no-hitter against the Chicago White Sox but lost the game 4-0. The following year, Major League Baseball changed the rule to require a minimum nine complete innings pitched to count as a no-hitter, and as Hawkins pitched only eight innings, as Chicago hosted and did not bat in the ninth, his no-hitter is no longer official.

Line Score
July 1, Comiskey Park, Chicago, Illinois

Batting

Pitching

Player stats

Batting

Starters by position
Note: Pos = Position; G = Games played; AB = At bats; H = Hits; Avg. = Batting average; HR = Home runs; RBI = Runs batted in

Other batters
Note: G = Games played; AB = At bats; H = Hits; Avg. = Batting average; HR = Home runs; RBI = Runs batted in

Pitching

Starting pitchers
Note: G = Games pitched; IP = Innings pitched; W = Wins; L = Losses; ERA = Earned run average; SO = Strikeouts

Other pitchers
Note: G = Games pitched; IP = Innings pitched; W = Wins; L = Losses; ERA = Earned run average; SO = Strikeouts

Relief pitchers
Note: G = Games pitched; W = Wins; L = Losses; SV = Saves; ERA = Earned run average; SO = Strikeouts

Farm system

LEAGUE CHAMPIONS: Oneonta

References

1990 New York Yankees at Baseball Reference
1990 New York Yankees team page at www.baseball-almanac.com

New York Yankees seasons
New York Yankees
New York Yankees
1990s in the Bronx